Alexino is a rural locality (a selo) in Simskoye Rural Settlement, Yuryev-Polsky District, Vladimir Oblast, Russia. The population was 6 as of 2010.

Geography 
Alexino is located 22 km north of Yuryev-Polsky (the district's administrative centre) by road. Vyoska is the nearest rural locality.

References 

Rural localities in Yuryev-Polsky District